The Nye Committee, officially known as the Special Committee on Investigation of the Munitions Industry, was a United States Senate committee (April 12, 1934 – February 24, 1936), chaired by U.S. Senator Gerald Nye (R-ND). The committee investigated the financial and banking interests that underlay the United States' involvement in World War I and the operations and profits of the industrial and commercial firms supplying munitions to the Allies and to the United States. It was a significant factor in public and political support for American neutrality in the early stages of World War II.

Background 
During the 1920s and 1930s, dozens of books and articles appeared about the high cost of war, and some argued that financiers and arms manufacturers had maneuvered the United States into entering World War I. One of the best-known was Smedley D. Butler, a retired Marine Corps general who had become a spokesman for left-wing anti-war elements.  Historian Charles Callan Tansill's America Goes To War (1938) exploited the Nye Committee's voluminous report of testimony and evidence to develop and confirm the heavy influence exercised by Wall Street finance (notably J.P. Morgan) and the armaments industry (notably Du Pont) in the process that led to American intervention.

The push for the appointment of Senator Gerald Nye (R-ND) to the chairmanship of this committee came from Senator George Norris (R-NE). According to peace activist Dorothy Detzer, Norris said, "Nye's young, he has inexhaustible energy, and he has courage.  Those are all important boons. He may be rash in his judgments at times, but it's the rashness of enthusiasm."  Norris proposed Nye as "...the only one out of the 96 whom he deemed to have the competence, independence and stature for the task."

Organization 
The committee was established on April 12, 1934.  There were seven members: Nye, the committee chair; and Senators Homer T. Bone (D-WA), James P. Pope (D-ID), Bennett Champ Clark (D-MO), Walter F. George (D-GA), W. Warren Barbour (R-NJ), and Arthur H. Vandenberg (R-MI).

Stephen Rauschenbusch, son of Christian Social Gospel activist Walter Rauschenbusch, was appointed lead counsel for the Committee; his assisting counsel included Robert Wolforth, Josephine Burns and Alger Hiss. John T. Flynn "played a major role in the course of the investigation" as a member of the committee's Advisory Council of experts. Burns and Rauschenbush, who met on the committee, married soon after and co-authored a book that recounts salient testimony gathered by the investigation, War Madness (Washington, D.C., National Home Library Association, 1937).  Alger Hiss served as a legal assistant (counsel) to the committee from July 1934 to August 1935. Most famously, Hiss "badgered" DuPont officials and questioned and cross-examined Bernard Baruch on March 29, 1935.  About their testimony, Dorothy Detzer (Appointment On The Hill, p. 169) reports:  "The four solemn Du Pont brothers," averred that "the corporation's profits of 400% during the First World War seemed only the good fruit of sound business."

Process 
The Nye Committee conducted 93 hearings and questioned more than 200 witnesses.  The first hearings were in September 1934 and the final hearings in February 1936. The hearings covered four topics: 
 The munitions industry
 Bidding on Government contracts in the shipbuilding industry
 War profits
 The background leading up to U.S. entry into World War I.

The committee documented the huge profits that arms factories had made during the war. It found that bankers had pressured Wilson to intervene in the war in order to protect their loans abroad. Also, the arms industry was at fault for price-fixing and held excessive influence on American foreign policy leading up to and during World War I.

According to the United States Senate website:

In her memoir, Appointment On The Hill (p. 169), Dorothy Detzer, an intimate eye-witness to the Committee's processes, summarizes:  "The long exhaustive investigation ... produced a sordid report of intrigues and bribery; of collusion and excessive profits; of war scares artificially fostered and [disarmament] conferences deliberately wrecked."  The "recommendations, accompanying the committee's reports to the Senate, were presented in a series of interlocking legislative measures ... The Neutrality Bill, providing for an embargo on arms and loans to nations at war, was the only legislation even partially enacted into law.  But even it was crippled by its 'half-measure' provisions. (p. 171).

Results
Nye created headlines by drawing connections between the wartime profits of the banking and munitions industries to America's involvement in the World War. Many Americans felt betrayed and questioned that the war had been an epic battle between the forces of good (democracy) and evil (autocracy), as it had been depicted in pro-war propaganda. This investigation of these "merchants of death" helped to bolster sentiments favoring neutrality, non-interventionism, disarmament, and taking the profits out of weapons procurements.

The committee reported that between 1915 and January 1917, the United States lent Germany $27 million. In the same period, it lent to Britain and its allies $2.3 billion. These loans were made during wartime: July 28, 1914 – November 11, 1918.

Because of these facts Senator Nye, many war critics, and members of the American public concluded that the US entered the war for reasons of profit, not policy — because it was in the interest of American finance banks and investors for the Allies not to lose so that they would be able to pay interest and principal on their loans. The committee's findings did not achieve the aim of nationalization of the arms industry, but gave momentum to the non-interventionist movement, sparked the passage of the Neutrality Acts of the 1930s in 1935, 1936, 1937, and 1939, and encouraged Charles Lindbergh and other anti-Semites, who believed that the lenders were mostly Jewish. and that Jews were one of the principal groups advocating for U.S. intervention in Europe.

In its final report, the Nye Committee also identified the Chaco War between Bolivia and Paraguay as a key example of complicity between debt financiers, arms makers, and militaries. The Committee described the dynamic:

See also
 Merchants of death
Military-industrial complex

References

Further reading

 
 Nye Committee hearings (Munitions industry, naval shipbuilding: Preliminary report of the Special Committee on Investigation of the Munitions Industry):
 1934 September 5–6
 1934 September 10–12
 1934 December 6–7, 10
 1934 December 17–18
 1935 June
 1935 June 15–19
 1935 July 25-August 20
 .
 .
 Coulter, Matthew Ware. The Senate Munitions Inquiry of the 1930s: Beyond the Merchants of Death (Praeger, 1997). 
 Detzer, Dorothy. Appointment on the Hill (New York, Henry Holt, 1948) online. 
 .
 .
.
.
.

1934 establishments in Washington, D.C.
1936 disestablishments in Washington, D.C.
73rd United States Congress
Defunct committees of the United States Senate
Non-interventionism
United States in World War I